Ridenhour is a surname. Notable people with the surname include:

 Carlton Douglas Ridenhour (born 1960), aka Chuck D, American rapper, author, and producer
 Ronald Lee Ridenhour, soldier and journalist who helped expose the My Lai Massacre

See also
 The Ridenhour Prizes, Humanitarian awards